Amata leucacma  is a species of moth of the family Erebidae first described by Edward Meyrick in 1886. It is found in Queensland, Australia.

References 

leucacma
Moths described in 1886
Moths of Australia